Epietiocholanolone, also known as 3β-hydroxy-5β-androstan-17-one or as etiocholan-3β-ol-17-one, is an etiocholane (5β-androstane) steroid as well as an inactive metabolite of testosterone that is formed in the liver. The metabolic pathway is testosterone to 5β-dihydrotestosterone (via 5β-reductase), 5β-dihydrotestosterone to 3β,5β-androstanediol (via 3β-hydroxysteroid dehydrogenase), and 3β,5β-androstanediol to epietiocholanolone (via 17β-hydroxysteroid dehydrogenase). Epietiocholanolone can also be formed directly from 5β-androstanedione (via 3β-hydroxysteroid dehydrogenase). It is glucuronidated and sulfated in the liver and excreted in urine.

See also
 Androsterone
 Epiandrosterone
 Etiocholanolone

References

Etiocholanes
Human metabolites